The  EMD GL8 was an export diesel-electric locomotive introduced by General Motors Electro-Motive Division (EMD) in 1960. They have been designed as light locomotives with a low axle loading. Measuring 36 feet 2 inches over the end sills, they are equipped an EMD 8-567CR engine producing  for traction, driving four traction motors in either A1A-A1A or B-B flexicoil trucks.  The EMD GA8 is a derivative designed for very light lines with extremely sharp curves using frame mounted traction motors and freight car trucks.

Several countries have purchased GL8 locomotives.

Original owners

A1A-A1A version
 12 Taiwan, 
 12 Taiwan Railway Administration S201–S212 (S201-S207 are the first production GL8 locomotives, which have the locomotive bell mounted on the top of the engine compartment, a feature unique to these locomotives)
 41 East Pakistan, (now Bangladesh)
 41 East Bengal Railways 2201–2241

B-B version
 69 Brazil, :
 8 Rede Mineira de Viação 2851–2858
 23 Companhia Mogiana de Estradas de Ferro 51–73
 5 Estrada de Ferro Noroeste do Brasil 1001–1005
 18 Rede de Viação Paraná-Santa Catarina 1401–1418
 15 Estrada de Ferro Sorocabana 3601–3615
 15 Republic of Ireland, 
 15 Córas Iompair Éireann 121 Class B121–B135
 12 Tunisia,   and / or 
 12 Société Nationale de Chemins de Fer Tunisiens 040DF351–040DF362

C-C version 
 12 Australia, 
 12 Queensland Railways 1700 class 1700-1711 (Built by Clyde Engineering)

Gallery

See also 
List of GM-EMD locomotives

References

External links 

 The Unofficial EMD Homepage GL8 orders page

G08L
B-B locomotives
A1A-A1A locomotives
Metre gauge diesel locomotives
3 ft 6 in gauge locomotives
Standard gauge locomotives of Tunisia
5 ft 6 in gauge locomotives
Railway locomotives introduced in 1960
Diesel-electric locomotives of Taiwan
Diesel-electric locomotives of Pakistan
Diesel-electric locomotives of Brazil
Diesel-electric locomotives of Ireland
Diesel-electric locomotives of Tunisia